The men's association football tournament at the 2019 Indian Ocean Island Games was held in Mauritius.

The tournament was won by Reunion.

Teams

Officials
The following officials were announced to officiate for the tournament.

Referees
 Mohamed Athoumani
 Njaka Raharimanantsoa
 Adam Fazeel
 Imtehaz Heeralall
 Patrice Milazar
 Zachari Youssaffa
 Jean Fabrice Commandant

Assistant Referees
 Azilani Abdoulmadjid
 Said Omar Chebli
 Dimbiniaina Andriatianarivelo
 Danisson Ravelomandimby
 Jaufar Rasheed
 Fabien Cauvelet
 Shailesh Gobin
 Jeff Pithia
 Akhtar Nawaz Rossaye
 Eldrick Adelaide
 Vincent Drole

Group stage

Group A

Group B

Knockout stage

Bracket

Semi-finals

Third-place match (bronze medal)

Final (gold medal)

Medalists

Goalscorers

References

External links
 

2019
Indian Ocean Games 2019